Stomil Olsztyn is a Polish football club based in Olsztyn. It was founded on 15 July 1945 as OKS Warmiak. The brightest era of this club was the 1990s when it played in the Polish First League. Between 2004 and 2012 the team was known as OKS 1945 Olsztyn, then also as OKS Stomil Olsztyn.

Successes 
 6th in Polish First League (season 1995/96)
 Quarter-final in Polish Cup (seasons 1998/99 and 2000/01)

Emblem 

The emblem of the club depicts a Great Cormorant.

Players

Current squad

Out on loan

Former players
 Mariusz Wysocki
 Piotr Tyszkiewicz

Stomil's achievements

Before promotions to First League

In Ekstraklasa

After relegation from Ekstraklasa

Notable managers 
 Józef Łobocki
 Bogusław Kaczmarek
 Jerzy Budziłek
 Stanisław Dawidczyński
 Zbigniew Kieżun
 Ryszard Polak
 Marek Chojnacki
 Jerzy Masztaler
 Maciej Radkiewicz

References

External links 
 
 
 Stomil Olsztyn (90minut.pl) 

 
Football clubs in Olsztyn
Association football clubs established in 1945
1945 establishments in Poland